Michael Robert Lamb (born August 9, 1975) is an American former professional baseball third baseman and first baseman.  Lamb stands 6'1" and weighs 205 pounds.

Career

Texas Rangers/New York Yankees
Lamb attended Bishop Amat High School in La Puente, California and California State University, Fullerton.  He was drafted by the Texas Rangers in the 7th round of the 1997 Major League Baseball Draft. Lamb made his Major League Baseball debut on April 23, for the Rangers. He played for the Rangers until February 5, when he was traded to the New York Yankees for minor leaguer Jose Garcia.

Houston Astros
Before playing a game for the Yankees, the Houston Astros acquired Lamb from the Yankees for minor leaguer Juan DeLeon on March 25, 2004.

In , he saw more playing time due to regular first baseman Jeff Bagwell's injury. In 2005, he batted .233 with 10 home runs and 50 RBI, with 1 stolen base. He participated in the 2005 World Series where he hit the first World Series home run in Astros history, becoming only the second player whose last name is a type of animal to homer in the World Series (the first was Tim Salmon in 2002).

Minnesota Twins
On December 14, Lamb signed a two-year deal with the Minnesota Twins. On August 25, he was designated for assignment to make room on the roster for Eddie Guardado.

Milwaukee Brewers
He was released on September 4, and then signed with the Milwaukee Brewers the following day. Lamb became a free agent at the end of the  season. On December 9, however, he re-signed a new contract with the Brewers.  On April 1, 2009, after turning down a Triple-A assignment, Lamb was released by the Brewers.

New York Mets
On April 25, 2009, the New York Mets signed Lamb to a minor league contract.  He spent the entire 2009 season in the minor leagues. He became a free agent after the 2009 season.

Florida Marlins
On February 11, 2010, Lamb signed a minor league contract with the Florida Marlins, and was added to the Major League roster on April 3. On May 6, 2010, Lamb was designated for assignment, but was recalled to replace 4th outfielder Cameron Maybin on June 18.

Camden Riversharks/Second Stint with Yankees
Lamb signed a minor league contract with the New York Yankees on June 22, 2011, after beginning the season with the Camden Riversharks of Atlantic League. He was assigned to the Triple-A Scranton/Wilkes-Barre Yankees.

References

External links

Cal State Fullerton Titans baseball players
Houston Astros players
Texas Rangers players
Minnesota Twins players
Milwaukee Brewers players
Florida Marlins players
Major League Baseball third basemen
Major League Baseball first basemen
Baseball players from California
Pulaski Rangers players
Charlotte Rangers players
Oklahoma RedHawks players
Tulsa Drillers players
Buffalo Bisons (minor league) players
New Orleans Zephyrs players
Scranton/Wilkes-Barre Yankees players
1975 births
Living people
Sportspeople from West Covina, California
Camden Riversharks players